I Gusti Ngurah Rai International Airport , known as Denpasar International Airport, is the main airport of Bali, Indonesia. located  from Downtown Denpasar, serves the Denpasar metropolitan area and the Bali island. Ngurah Rai is the second busiest airport in Indonesia after Soekarno-Hatta, Ngurah Rai is one of the most popular island destination hubs in Asia. In 2018, the airport served 23,779,178 passengers. The new upgrades of Ngurah Rai has increased the popularity of Bali and has become one of the best airports in Asia and being more known worldwide. The airport has category IX and is capable of serving wide-body aircraft including the Boeing 747-8 and Airbus A380.

Airport Council International has awarded Ngurah Rai International Airport as the world's third best airport (with 15-25 million passengers each year) in 2016 based on their services.

The airport is named after I Gusti Ngurah Rai, a Balinese hero who died on 20 November 1946 in a puputan (fight to the death) against the Dutch at Marga in Tabanan, where the Dutch defeated his company with air support, killing Ngurah Rai and 95 others during the Indonesian Revolution in 1946.

Location
The airport is located in Tuban between Kuta and Jimbaran and is close to the tourist locations of The capital of Bali, Downtown Denpasar, is located nearby.

History

The Pelabuhan Udara Tuban, or Tuban airfield, was established in 1931 at the narrowest point on the southern coast of Bali. The airport was originally built as a simple 700 m long airstrip by the Dutch Colonial administration's Voor Verkeer en Waterstaats public works office.  When first established the site only had a few huts and a short grass runway. The northern end lay in the Tuban village graveyard and in the south it occupied previously vacant land. The location in this area of the island has subsequently facilitated arrivals and departures over the ocean with minimal noise and overflights intruding upon populated areas. The current airport has an east–west aligned runway and associated taxiway, with over 1,000 m of that runway's length projecting westward into the sea.

In 1942 the airstrip was in use to stage fighter and bomber operations and received bombing damage from Japanese forces. It was repaired using PSP pierced steel planking. The Japanese armed forces occupied Bali during the Second World War seizing the airport on 19 February 1942. A poorly motivated garrison of 600 Dutch led Balinese militia deserted almost immediately as the Japanese invaded the island. Their Dutch commander was to learn that through a misunderstanding of his orders, Tuban airfield had not been destroyed by explosives as he had ordered. Apparently his order not to delay the demolition was misread by the demolition engineers at the airstrip who thought instead that he wanted the operation delayed. This confusion allowed the Japanese to take the airfield completely intact.  During the occupation period the Japanese made improvements to the runway at the airport. In the five years from 1942 to 1947 the length of the runway was extended to 1,200 m from the original 700 m.  Many Balinese identified the Japanese invaders as being potential liberators from the Dutch colonial authorities who were unpopular on the island. There was never a significant Japanese fighter squadron stationed in Denpasar although it was within the field of tactical air operations conducted from both Surabaya and Allied airbases in northern Australia. More so the taking of Tuban airfield and the island of Bali deprived the allied forces of a fighter staging field en route from Australia to defend Java. At the time the airport was still called Tuban Airfield, named after the local fishing village.

In 1949 a terminal building and other aviation facilities were constructed and a simple wooden flight control tower was erected. Aviation communication was by morse code transceiver.  In 1959 president Sukarno sought to further develop the airstrip. The new facilities were built as part of a $13 million (Rp 35 billion in 1959) renovation project.

To allow jet aircraft such as the Douglas DC8 and the Boeing 707 to operate from Bali, it was necessary to extend the runway westward into the sea as any potential eastern extension of the runway was by now blocked by the expansion of the local fishing village. An international airport was developed with the decision by the Indonesia government to further develop and rebuild the terminal building and extend the existing airport runway westward by 1,200 m to a length of 2,700 m with two 100 m overruns. The project, which lasted from 1963 to 1969, was named Project Tuban Airport and was for preparation of Tuban Airport for international operations. Land reclamation to project the runway and the two overruns by 1,500 m was achieved by taking material from the limestone rocks at Ungasan and sand from the river Antosari–Tabanan. With the completion of the temporary terminal and runway project at the Tuban Airport, the government inaugurated international air service on 10 August 1966.

To meet the ever-increasing number of passengers the terminal buildings were extended with construction of an international terminal building undertaken from 1965 to 1969. This added international facilities to the existing domestic passenger terminal. The new Ngurah Rai International Airport was inaugurated the on 1 August 1968 by the then Indonesian President Suharto as Pelabuhan Udara Internasional Ngurah Rai, or Ngurah Rai International Airport. The name came from I Gusti Ngurah Rai who was a significant national republican figure during the struggle for independence in Indonesia.

The current airport is named after I Gusti Ngurah Rai, an Indonesian National Hero an Indonesian republican who died on 20 November 1946 in a puputan (fight to the death) against the Dutch at Marga in Tabanan where the Dutch defeated them with the aid of aircraft, killing Ngurah Rai and 95 others during the Indonesian Revolution in 1946.

The earlier extension of the runway subsequently caused disruption of natural sand flow along the coast.
By 1975 the anticipated rise in passenger volumes was already overburdening the older terminal and works were commenced on a new international passenger terminal, with completion in 1978.  The old International Terminal was then converted into the now Domestic Terminal and the old Domestic Terminal was converted to use as the Cargo and Catering facilities building.

On 1 October 1980 based on the Government Decree No. 26 of 1980, the management of Ngurah Rai International Airport was passed over from the Directorate of Air Transportation to Perum Angkasa Pura.  Since then the aviation facilities including the apron, the terminal and other buildings have been further developed by Perum Angkasa Pura. In 1986 by Government Decree No. 25 Perum Angkasa Pura changed name to become Perum Angkasa Pura I. The Indonesian term Pelabuhan Udara was changed into Bandar Udara based on the Transportations Ministerial Decision No.213/HK.207/Phb-85 on 1 September 1985. Commencing 1 October 1989 until 31 August 1992 further major airport improvement works were undertaken including a landing strip extension to 3,000 m, taxiway relocations, apron expansion, passenger and cargo building expansions and the further development of air navigational and aircraft fueling facilities. With the issuing of the Government Decree No. 5 of 1992 then Perum Angkasa Pura I was converted into a PT. (Persero) Angkasa Pura 1. Company activities include aviation facilities provisions and airport services. Project Phase II was carried out 10 February 1998 with planned completion June 2000.

Development since the 2000s

In 2000, the airport recorded 43,797 domestic and international flights, carrying 4,443,856 passengers. By the end of April 2011, the airport's terminals handled 11.1 million passengers a year, exceeding its capacity of 8 million. PT Angkasa Pura I will relocate 35 guest houses to accommodate the expansion, which is expected to occupy up to 265.5 hectares of land for a new access road to the airport and a new airport building, the construction of a new flyover, enlarge airport terminal and improve luggage handling system.

There have been several plans made seeking a solution to the expansion problems at Ngurah Rai International airport. There have been proposals to develop a north–south runway, but existing land use in the areas adjacent to the airport makes this idea unfeasible due to the considerable land purchase costs. A completely new airport was proposed to ease the airport' congestion due to the area surrounding the existing airport not supporting significant long-term expansion. And can accommodate 25 million passengers a year until 2025. This provided land for building a new horseshoe shaped building for 17 passenger aircraft parking at the east area on the former domestic terminal. The plan also incorporated a runway extension to 3,600 m. Currently airplanes up to the size of Boeing 747-400, Boeing 747-8, Boeing 777-300ER, Boeing 787-10, and Airbus A350-1000 can use the airport. Although Ngurah Rai International Airport already has a parking slot for the Airbus A380, some taxiway turns are still being widened to accommodate the superjumbo jet.

In 2005 the Transportation Security Administration of the United States of America determined that the airport was not meeting the security standards of the International Civil Aviation Administration; however, this warning was lifted in 2007. Currently around 800 of the total employees at Ngurah Rai are security personnel.

Masterplan
The master plan was originally proposed prior to the tourism downturn in Bali following the two bombing incidents. The airport and Bali's economy, which are almost exclusively dependent on tourism suffered considerably from the decline in tourists. Since these proposals were originally made the tourism sector has experienced a gradual recovery and a new international airport has been built on the nearby island of Lombok to the east of Bali. The new Lombok International Airport was first announced in 2005. A stage one completed runway of 2,750 m opened on 1 October 2011 and a proposed stage 2 development of 4,000 m is planned for the new facility. It is anticipated that some of the requirement for expansion of Bali's Ngurah Rai International Airport will be mitigated with the opening of the new facility in Lombok. Lombok is approximately 25 mins away by air from Ngurah Rai International Airport.

Plans to expand the international and domestic terminals at Ngurah Rai International Airport were announced in September 2008 with estimated costs of up to Rp 1 trillion (US$110.10 million) and a 2011 planned completion date. In December 2008, the operating company announced that the expansion works at Tuban would begin in early 2009.

Airport Facilities Development and Flight Safety (FBUKP) Phase III for Ngurah Rai International Airport includes the terminal building, a multi story car parking building, and apron. The plan involves developing the site of the current domestic terminal which will be used as a new 120,000 m2 international terminal with the existing international terminal being converted into the new domestic terminal. It is projected that subsequent to these plans being completed Ngurah Rai International Airport will be able to accommodate up to 25 million passengers per annum.

The planned airport buildings were described as a blend contemporary and Balinese traditional architectural elements as required by provincial bylaw No 5/2005 on building designs.

In October 2010 it was reported that the new terminal will be able to handle 20 million passengers a year by 2020 and up to 30 million passengers per year by 2030.

In November 2010 the government allocated Rp 1.9 trillion to realise the terminal improvement plan. Plans are for the work to be completed prior to the expected demands of the 2013 APEC Summit. Rp 3.5 trillion funding was announced for the combined airport and the previously planned connecting toll road projects, with Rp 1.9 trillion allocated to the airport. May 2013 was set as the deadline for both projects.

.

 which enable the airport to accommodate up to 25 million passengers a year or twice its current capacity. The project will also add Visa on Arrival counters from the existing 7 to 35 and Immigration counters from the present 12 to 20. The airport will also use a state-of-the-art security and baggage handling system as the first airport in Indonesia use it.

New airport

With about 12 to 15 per cent passengers growth annually, the airport will reach 20 million passengers per annum in 2017, which is the current airport's full capacity. Lengthening the existing runway is not possible either due to the densely populated areas adjacent to the airport, or environmental concerns regarding land reclamation. A site for a new, larger airport with two runways has been identified in the northern part of Bali, in the eastern part of Buleleng Regency.

Terminals and facilities
The International terminal has a Balinese architectural theme and has separate departure and arrival halls. The departures area has 62 check-in counters that are equipped with electronic scales and luggage conveyors. Ten of the international gates have jet bridges and automated aircraft parking systems. The international departure lounge areas have a total capacity of 3,175 passengers.

It can serve up to 9.4 million passengers a year, has 62 check in counters, four transit and transfer counters, 19 ticket counters, eight boarding gates and seven arrival gates which are provided by five aviobridges (garbarata) and 5 unit conveyor belts.

The airport operates a fleet of buses to ferry passengers to and from aircraft operating low cost flights which do not use an airbridge. Domestic travelers and also some international travellers are often ferried to aircraft parked on the apron between the domestic terminal and the cargo terminal to the east of the International and Domestic terminals using these buses.

The terminal also has prayer rooms, smoking areas, showers and massage services. Various lounge areas are provided, some including children's play areas and cinemas, showing films, news, variety, entertainment and sport channels.

Because about 500 private jets and aircraft land at the airport every month, the airport authority has built an apron at the south of the airport with a special exit gate which can accommodate 14 narrow/small bodied airplanes.

Ground transportation
Ngurah Rai International Airport is connected by highway via Bali Mandara Toll Road to Denpasar and Nusa Dua.

Public transport 
Three bus rapid transit corridors served the Ngurah Rai International Airport. While only one Trans Metro Dewata corridor entered the airport premises, users of  system can transfer to other corridors within Denpasar city center free of charge. Trans Sarbagita mainly provides access to destinations south of the airport, especially the GWK monument complex and Nusa Dua resort.

Airlines and destinations

Accidents and incidents

Statistics 

The following table shows total passenger numbers.

References

Bibliography

External links 
 
 Ngurah Rai Airport Official Website-includes flight information
 Directorate General of Civil Aviation Republic of Indonesia
 History of Ngurah Rai International Airport 1930–2010

Airports established in 1931
Airports in Bali
Badung Regency